TI3 may refer to:
 The International 2013, a Dota 2 tournament
 Twilight Imperium: Third Edition, a 2005 board game
 Ti3, a component of Titanium aluminide